Momo is a 2003 German animated television series based on the novel of the same name by Michael Ende.

Plot 
The little orphan girl Momo hides in a train and jumps off when she sees the conductor. She meets the little turtle Cassiopeia, who accompanies her from then on, and they settle to live in the ruins of an amphitheater on the outskirts of the city. Together they get to know the children of the city as well as the street sweeper Beppo, who sees in Momo the gift of enchanting people and bringing out the best in them.

However, the mysterious cigars-smoking grey men arrive in the city in order to steal the time of their inhabitants. They lie and persuade them to deposit their lifetime into a time savings bank, so that everyone starts working obsessively to save time. They specifically aim at the adults, as they find it more difficult to convince the children. However, Momo tries to defend herself against the machinations of the grey men and to win back and free her friends.

When the world has already turned very grey, the wise turtle Cassiopeia leads Momo into the realm of Professor Hora, the keeper of Time, who explains the situation to Momo. In order to prevent the worse, she has to infiltrate herself to the headquarters of the time thieves and try to thwart their plans.

Differences with the books 
In addition to the turtle Cassiopeia, Professor Hora is shown to have two more pets: the rooster and the owl, respectively the guardian of the day and of the night.

Furthermore, the children have different names than in the novel and Gigi himself is portrayed as one of the children or young teenagers, and not as a young man as in the novel.

Production and distribution 
The 55-minute special "A girl named Momo - The beginning of a journey into the realm of time" was first broadcast on October 31, 2003, on the television channel KiKA.

The series consists of 26 episodes and started on November 3, 2003 and is a spin-off of the 2001 Italian animated film Momo alla conquista del tempo.

The series was included on the video-on-demand service  and has also been released on DVD and VHS.

Cast 
Momo and her friends:
  as Momo
  as Gigi, the tourist guide
 Wolfgang Völz as Beppo, the street sweeper
 Friedrich Schönfelder Professor Hora, the keeper of Time
 Roland Hemmo as Nino, the owner of a café
  as Liliana, Nino's wife
  as Nicola, the carpenter
  as Fusi, the barber
  as Fusi' Parrot
  as Mrs. Pappardelle, the school teacher

The grey men:

  as Director of the time saving bank
  as Accountant
  as Special Agent
  as Agent
  as Agent 100
 Reiner Schöne as Agent 1313
  as Agent 384

Episodes list

External links 

 
 Momo at Filmaffinity,com
 Momo at Zeichentrickserien.de
 Momo at Fernsehserien.de

References 

2003 television series debuts
German animated television series
German novels adapted into television shows
Animated series based on novels
Time in fiction